The Archdeacon of Rochdale is a senior ecclesiastical officer within the Diocese of Manchester.

As Archdeacon he or she is responsible for the disciplinary supervision of the clergy within the five area deaneries: Ashton-under-Lyne, Heywood and Middleton, Rochdale, Oldham East and Oldham West.

Created on 3 June 1910 from the Manchester archdeaconry, the post is currently vacant.

List of archdeacons
1910–1919 (ret.): Arthur Clarke
1919–1935 (ret.): Thomas Sale (afterwards archdeacon emeritus)
1935–20 December 1950 (d.): Albert Gaskell
1951–1962 (ret.): Edgar Stephenson (afterwards archdeacon emeritus)
1962–1966 (res.): Len Tyler
1966–1972 (res.): Arthur Ballard (became Archdeacon of Manchester)
1972–1982 (ret.): Harold Fielding (afterwards archdeacon emeritus)
1982–1991 (res.): David Bonser (became Bishop suffragan of Bolton)
1991–2000 (res.): Mark Dalby (afterwards archdeacon emeritus)
2000–2005 (res.): Andrew Ballard (became Archdeacon of Manchester)
2006–2008 (res.): Mark Davies (became Bishop suffragan of Middleton)
20085 January 2020 (res.): Cherry Vann (became Bishop of Monmouth)
1 July 2020present: David Sharples (previously Archdeacon of Salford)

References

Lists of Anglicans
 
Lists of English people
Archdeacons of Rochdale